Alexander Petrie (14 February 1853 – 4 February 1909) was a Scotland international  rugby union player who represented Scotland from 1873 to 1880.

Rugby Union career

Amateur career

Petrie played as a forward for Royal HSFP.

Provincial career

Petrie represented Edinburgh District against Glasgow District in the world's first provincial match, the 'inter-city', on 23 November 1872.

Petrie also represented Edinburgh District against Glasgow District in the 5 December 1874 match.

International career

Petrie's international debut was the home match on 3 March 1873 at Glasgow. He turned out for Scotland a total of 11 times, his last match on 28 February 1880.

Referee career

After playing, Petrie took up refereeing rugby union matches. He refereed an international in 1882. He also became President of the Scottish Rugby Union.

Outside of rugby

Petrie was noted in other sports:- weightlifting, rowing and the hammer throw.

References

1853 births
1909 deaths
Scottish rugby union players
Scotland international rugby union players
Rugby union forwards
Edinburgh District (rugby union) players
Royal HSFP players
Rugby union players from Birkenhead
Scottish rugby union referees
East of Scotland District players
Presidents of the Scottish Rugby Union
Blues Trial players